Keen Hunter is a thoroughbred racehorse. He won the Prix de l'Abbaye de Longchamp at Longchamp Racecourse in Paris in 1991.

1987 racehorse births
Racehorses bred in Kentucky
Racehorses trained in the United Kingdom
Thoroughbred family 4-k